Tazewell is a town in Tazewell County, Virginia, United States. The population was 4,627 at the 2010 census. It is part of the Bluefield, WV-VA micropolitan area, which has a population of 107,578. It is the county seat of Tazewell County.

History
Named Jeffersonville until 1892, Tazewell was developed near the headwaters of the Clinch River. It is one of the smallest towns in the United States to have once operated a street car. It is in a county that underwent rapid growth in population at the end of the 19th century during the period of the coal and iron boom, as resources of the Pocahontas Coalfields were exploited.

The Big Crab Orchard Site, Bull Thistle Cave Archeological Site, Burke's Garden Rural Historic District, Chimney Rock Farm, Tazewell Historic District, George Oscar Thompson House (now demolished), and James Wynn House are listed on the National Register of Historic Places.

Geography
Tazewell is located at  (37.126938, −81.519455).

According to the United States Census Bureau, the town has a total area of 4.0 square miles (10.5 km2), all land.

A 32-mile stretch of Virginia State Highway 16 is known locally as the Back of the Dragon because of the hundreds of sharp rising and lowering turns between Hungry Mother State Park and Tazewell. The section of highway is popular with motorcycle enthusiasts and sports car aficionados.

Climate
The climate in this area has mild differences between highs and lows, and there is adequate rainfall year-round.  According to the Köppen Climate Classification system, Tazewell has a marine west coast climate, abbreviated "Cfb" on climate maps.

Demographics

As of the census of 2000, there were 4,206 people, 1,650 households, and 1,098 families living in the town. The population density was 1,040.1 people per square mile (402.0/km2). There were 1,804 housing units at an average density of 446.1 per square mile (172.4/km2). The racial makeup of the town was 88.78% White, 9.32% African American, 0.17% Native American, 0.52% Asian, 0.36% from other races, and 0.86% from two or more races. Hispanic or Latino of any race were 0.62% of the population.

There were 1,650 households, out of which 26.1% had children under the age of 18 living with them, 51.7% were married couples living together, 11.8% had a female householder with no husband present, and 33.4% were non-families. 31.2% of all households were made up of individuals, and 15.6% had someone living alone who was 65 years of age or older. The average household size was 2.25 and the average family size was 2.81.

In the town, the population was spread out, with 18.6% under the age of 18, 8.1% from 18 to 24, 26.3% from 25 to 44, 25.3% from 45 to 64, and 21.7% who were 65 years of age or older. The median age was 43 years. For every 100 females, there were 92.1 males. For every 100 females age 18 and over, there were 87.3 males.

The median income for a household in the town was $28,510, and the median income for a family was $37,792. Males had a median income of $35,912 versus $22,664 for females. The per capita income for the town was $15,468. About 11.6% of families and 20.6% of the population were below the poverty line, including 20.7% of those under age 18 and 27.8% of those age 65 or over.

Notable people
Kathryn Harrold – television and movie actress
Betony Vernon - American jewelry designer based in Paris.
Fred M. Wilcox – director of the film Forbidden Planet

References

External links
 Town of Tazewell
 Tazewell County Historical Society

Towns in Tazewell County, Virginia
County seats in Virginia
Towns in Virginia